Harry Blons (né Harry Raymond Yblonski; 29 November 1911 Saint Paul, Minnesota  — 20 July 1987 Minneapolis, Minnesota) was an American jazz clarinetist from Minnesota.  He performed with the touring groups of Hal McIntyre, Red Nichols, and Red Dougherty.  He had performed with jazz combos in Saint Paul and Minneapolis.

Career 
At the end of the 1940s, Blons began fronting his own group and playing in the Dixieland style. In 1954 he was featured on both clarinet and tenor sax in the Doc Evans combo, not abandoning the Harry Blons Six as the group remained active in the mid-1950s. Blons continued to be associated with his native St. Paul. While much of his group's recorded output is out of print, various live recordings done in Minnesota when stars such as Bunk Johnson and Don Ewell came through town remain in circulation. His recordings as a leader include the excellent Singin' the Blues, originally released by Mercury Records. Blons also created vinyl product for the Zephyr, Audio Fidelity, and Audiophile Records labels.

Selected discography 
 Traditional jazz. Vol. 7, Doc Evans
 Doc Evans; Harry Blons; John W Parker; Hal Runyan; George Tupper; Bill Peer; Red Maddock
 Audiophile Records (1956)

 Traditional jazz, vol. 6 by Doc Evans
 Audiophile Records (196?)

 Dixie By Gaslight, Singleton Palmer 	
 Singleton Palmer & Harry Blons' Dixieland Band
 Norman Records (1964)

 Dixieland Jazz, Harry Blons 	
 Audiophile Records (1951)

 Six on a Dixie Kick
 Harry Blons; Dixie Six
 Mercury Records (1957)

 Dixieland From the Deep North
 Featuring Mendota Buzzards
 Red Dougherty, Harry Blons, Warren Thewis, Larry Brakke, Bob Gruenenfelder, Gerald Mullaney, Thomas McGovern, Bernard Sundermeyer, Leigh Kammon, Mendota Buzzards
 Zephyr (195?)

 Down in Jungle Town, Doc Evans 	
 Doc Evans, Harry Blons, Loren Helberg, Tom McGovern, pianist, Hal Runyon, Hod Russell, Mickey Steinke, Bernie Sundermeyer, Warren Thewis, George Tupper, Erv Wickner, Doc Evans' Jazz Band
 Jazzology Records (2000)

 Harry Blons 	
 Harry Blons' Ensemble
 Harry Blons, Willie Peterson, Eddie Tolck, Don Anderson, guitarist, Bernie Sundermeier, Warren Thewis
 Audiophile Records (195?)

 Four or five times by Doc Evans 	
 Jazzology Records (2002)

 Ray Bauduc-Nappy Lamare and their Dixieland
 Ray Bauduc, Nappy Lamare, Harry Blons' Dixieland Band
 Capitol Records (197?)

 Teddy Buckner at the Crescendo
 Teddy Buckner, Harry Blons' Dixieland Band.
 GNP Crescendo Record Co. (1976)

 Caution blues by Muggsy Spanier 	
 Muggsy Spanier, Harry Blons' Dixieland Band
 78 rpm
 Mercury Records (1950?)

 Bunk Johnson & Don Ewell: The Complete Minneapolis, 1947
 Bunk Johnson, Don Ewell, Harry Blons, Don Thompson, trombonist, Cliff Johnson, string bass player, Warren Thewis, Doc Evans' Jazz Band.
 American Music Records (2009)

 Broadcast programmer No. 1
 Johnny Puleo, Ed Jackson; Jo Basile; Lionel Hampton; Val Valenti; Leon Barry; Larry Adler; Dave Wierbach; Dukes of Dixieland.; Harmonica Gang.; Marimba Chiapas.; Harry Blons' Dixieland Band
 Audiophile Records (196?)

 Bob Mitch Presents a Dixie Bouquet
 Harry Blons' Dixieland Band.;
 78 rpm
 EDN Records, Milwaukee (1950)

 Easy Listening
 Red Dougherty & Harry Blons;
 Audiophile Records (195?)

 Breezin
 Arthur Kay, Harry Blons, Claude Falenczyk, Grant Krueger, Joseph Szot, Gene Juckem
 Audiophile Records (195?)

 Pee Wee Hunt and his Dixieland Band
 Pee Wee Hunt and his Dixieland Band & Harry Blons' Dixieland Band.
 Royale Records, [1956?]

 Sweet Georgia Brown
 Muggsy Spanier, Harry Blons' Dixieland Band.
 78 rpm
 Mercury Records, [1950]

 Windy City Jazz, Max Kaminsky
 Max Kaminsky, Pee Wee Russell, Miff Mole, Joe Sullivan, George Wettling, Jack Lesberg, Tavern in the Town, Harry Blons' Dixieland Band
 Concert Hall Records (195?)

References

1911 births
1987 deaths
Musicians from Saint Paul, Minnesota
Dixieland clarinetists
American jazz clarinetists
Jazz musicians from Minnesota
Mercury Records artists
20th-century American musicians